Sevrier (before 2017: Sévrier) is a commune in the Haute-Savoie department in the Auvergne-Rhône-Alpes region in south-eastern France.

It is located on the north-western banks of Lake Annecy. It is essentially a residential suburb of Annecy.

World heritage site
It is home to one or more prehistoric pile-dwelling (or stilt house) settlements that are part of the Prehistoric Pile dwellings around the Alps UNESCO World Heritage Site.

See also
Communes of the Haute-Savoie department

References

External links 

Communes of Haute-Savoie